Karosa C 955 is an intercity bus produced by bus manufacturer Karosa from the Czech Republic, in the years 2001 to 2006. It was succeeded by Irisbus Crossway in 2006.

Construction features 
Karosa C 955 is model of Karosa 900 series. C 955 is based on C 954. Body was assembled to the skeleton, which has undergone a dip stage, sheets were galvanized and painted and then to have it installed additional components. Body is semi-self-supporting with frame and engine with manual gearbox is placed in the rear part. Only rear axle is propulsed. Front and rear axles are solid. All axles are mounted on air suspension. On the right side are two doors. Inside are used cloth seats. Drivers cab is not separated from the rest of the vehicle.

Production and operation 
In 2002 started serial production, which continued until 2006.

Historical vehicles 
Any historical vehicle was not saved yet.

See also 

 Article about Karosa C 955 buses in Prague

 List of buses

Buses manufactured by Karosa
Buses of the Czech Republic